The British Under-19 Championship is an annual motorcycle speedway competition open to British national speedway riders aged nineteen years and under at the start of each year. In 2011, it was replaced the British Under-18 Championship.

British Under-18 Champions

British Under-19 Champions

See also 
 British Speedway Championship
 British Speedway Under 21 Championship
 Speedway in the United Kingdom

References 

British 19
National championships in the United Kingdom
Annual sporting events in the United Kingdom